Nulltown is an unincorporated community in Columbia Township, Fayette County, Indiana.

History
Nulltown was named for the Null brothers, who owned a sawmill at the town site. The first post office in Nulltown was opened in 1847.

Nulltown was a depot on the Whitewater Valley Railroad.

Geography

Nulltown Wingnuts Flight Club 
The Nulltown Wingnuts is a group of pilots who fly ultralight airplanes based out of Nulltown and fly throughout the region displaying their aircraft. The Wingnuts host a fly-in every September.

References

Unincorporated communities in Fayette County, Indiana
Unincorporated communities in Indiana